Michelle Fraley (née Hernández) is a retired military officer and was the Superintendent of the Puerto Rico Police. Fraley is also the first Puerto Rican woman to graduate from West Point Military Academy and the first woman to hold the aforementioned post of superintendent. She is also the former chief of staff of the Army Network Enterprise Technology Command. Academically, Fraley holds a Master of Business Administration (MBA) from Nova Southeastern University, a Master of Arts (M.A.) in International Relations and Affairs from Troy University, and a Ph.D. in organizational leadership from the University of Phoenix.

Fraley retired from the United States Army in 2014 after 30 years of service. Her final of six commanding posts before retiring was as commander of the Walter Reed Army Medical Center Warrior Transition Brigade (WTB) in the National Capital Area.  As she completed her final post, she was described as a "Wonder Woman" in dealing with wounded warriors that returned from the battlefront to assume other roles in the military or transition into private life.

After her retirement, she returned to her homeland of Puerto Rico. Upon her return, she was appointed as special assistant to the Superintendent of the Puerto Rico Police, leading the Strategic Initiative Group. In this capacity, Fraley was charged with analyzing the entire state police organization. After Ricardo Rosselló won the 2016 Puerto Rico general elections, Governor elect Roselló nominated her for Superintendent of the Puerto Rico Police. Fraley resigned on January 8, 2018.

Military awards

  Defense Superior Service Medal
  Legion of Merit with one oak leaf cluster
  Defense Meritorious Service Medal with three oak leaf clusters
  Meritorious Service Medal
  Joint Service Commendation Medal
  Army Commendation Medal with one oak leaf cluster
  Joint Service Achievement Medal
  National Defense Service Medal with one bronce Service star
  Armed Forces Expeditionary Medal
  Kosovo Campaign Medal
  Global War on Terrorism Service Medal
  Armed Forces Service Medal
  Humanitarian Service Medal
  Army Service Ribbon
  NATO Medal (Yugoslavia)
  NATO Medal (Kosovo)
  Joint Meritorious Unit Award
  Army Meritorious Unit Commendation 
  Army Superior Unit Award
Badges:
  Parachutist badge

See also

 History of women in Puerto Rico
 List of Puerto Rican military personnel
 Puerto Rican women in the military

References

External links
 LinkedIn profile

1962 births
Living people
Female United States Army officers
United States Army personnel of the Kosovo War
Nova Southeastern University alumni
Recipients of the Defense Superior Service Medal
Puerto Rican military officers
Puerto Rican Army personnel
Puerto Rican women in the military
Superintendents of the Puerto Rico Police
United States Army colonels
United States Military Academy alumni
Troy University alumni
Women in the United States Army
20th-century American women